The Acura EL is a subcompact executive car that was built at Honda's Alliston, Ontario, plant, and also the first Acura built in Canada. It was also exclusively sold in Canada. The EL is a badge-engineered Honda Civic with a higher level of features. There is no Type-S trim offered on any Acura EL.

The Acura EL was a sales success. Representing 51% of Acura Canada's annual new-vehicle sales in its first full year, the EL remained Acura's top seller in Canada from 1997 to 2003.  The Acura EL was replaced for the 2006 model year by the Acura CSX which, like the EL, was available only in Canada.



First generation (1997–2000)

Seeing that sales within Canada for the four-door Acura Integra were extremely low, Honda decided to replace it with the four-door-only Acura EL. The first generation of the EL was a somewhat altered version of the 1997–2000 Honda Civic with the differing front end, trunk, lights and various interior pieces. Produced by Honda Canada, the EL would also be rebadged and exported to Japan as the second-generation Honda Domani.

The EL has additional features not available on Civics such as amber-lit LED interior dash display, tachometer, power trunk (no keyhole on the trunklid), alarm, 15-inch (195/55/15) wheels, antenna in the rear window glass, chrome interior door handles, extra pocket underneath the centre console, paint-matched mirrors, side mouldings, and door handles, slightly stiffer suspension, 12-mm rear sway bar and 26-mm front sway bar, heated mirrors, and an amplifier. From 1999, all 5-speed models had a leather-wrapped shift knob, similar to the one in the Acura Integra GS-R.

Model configurations
In addition to the above: 
 Base: CD player, air conditioning 
 Sport: 15-inch alloy wheels, CD player, air conditioning. From 1999: folding heated mirrors, a sunroof, and an upgraded grill on the front end. 
 Premium: in addition to the Sport, leather seats, and decorative spoiler.

Second generation (2001–2005)

The EL was completely redesigned for the 2001 model year and was then based on the seventh-generation Civic. Besides the slightly more powerful and torquier VTEC-equipped 1.7 L 4-cylinder SOHC engine with 127 hp (95 kW), headlight and taillight designs and available leather interior trimmings set it apart from the Civic.  Other differences include 15-inch multi-spoke alloys, heated power mirrors, cruise control, and rear disc brakes. The badging was changed to Acura 1.7EL and was dropped altogether for 2004.

The second generation was available in touring and premium trim levels,  the latter adding leather seats, heated front seats and a power sunroof. Automatic climate control was added for the premium trim in 2003 and the touring trim in 2004. All second generation EL models came with ABS anti-lock braking, but in 2003 an electronic brakeforce distribution system was made standard. For 2003 and 2004, a special dealer-installed 'aero package' was made available for both trims levels adding unique front and rear lips, side stills and a rear spoiler. In 2004, the EL underwent a slight exterior makeover with restyled headlamps, front bumper and grille, taillights, trunk lid, and rear bumper.  The new look came with standard fog lights, a restyled steering wheel, new woodgrain trim patterns, and two additional tweeters powered by two amplifiers to complete the 6-speaker audio system.

Discontinuation
Despite being Acura Canada’s best-selling vehicle, Honda announced that it would discontinue the EL. In 2006, the CSX was confirmed to be a replacement for the EL. Like the EL, the CSX was sold only in Canada. The CSX was discontinued in 2011.

References

EL
Honda Civic
Compact executive cars
Compact cars
Front-wheel-drive vehicles
Sedans
Cars of Canada
2000s cars
Cars introduced in 1997